Luocheng    , formerly romanized as Lo-ch’eng, may refer to:

Places 
 La Thành, the name of several historical Chinese fortifications along the Red River in the area of present-day Hanoi, Vietnam, including Longbian, Songping, and the present city, particularly
 Đại La, a fortress around which present Hanoi grew up
 Luocheng County, a short form of Luocheng Mulao Autonomous County, Guangxi, China
 Luocheng, Shaoyang (罗城乡), a township of Shaoyang County, Hunan, China
 , a township of Qianwei County, Sichuan, China
 , a township in Wanzai County, Jiangxi, China

People and fictional people

People 
 , general, martial artist, monk, famed spear user, founder of the Temple of Touwushi Guanyin (頭屋石觀音寺) in Touwu Township, Miaoli County, Taiwan.
 Luo Cheng (羅成) (born 1971), politician, formerly Deputy Secretary and County Chief of Fengdu County Committee, Chongqing City.

Fictional people 
 Luo Cheng (罗成), the fictionalized representation of the son of Luo Yi.